William Owusu may refer to:
 William Owusu (footballer, born 1989), Ghanaian football striker
 William Owusu (footballer, born 1991), Ghanaian football midfielder